Yorktown or York Town may refer to:

Places

Australia
York Town, Tasmania

United Kingdom
 York Town, also known as Yorktown (and sometimes Yorkshiretown), a part of Camberley, Surrey (adjoining Sandhurst)
York, North Yorkshire

United States
Yorktown, Indiana
Yorktown, New York
Yorktown Heights, New York, within Yorktown
Yorktown, Texas
Yorktown, Virginia

Battles
Siege of Yorktown (1781), during the American Revolutionary War
Siege of Yorktown (1862), during the American Civil War

Other uses
Yorktown High School (disambiguation)
USS Yorktown, any of several U.S. Navy ships
"Yorktown (The World Turned Upside Down)", a song from the musical Hamilton
SS Yorktown (1894)

See also
Yorkton (disambiguation)